Xuelian Feng, also spelled Xuelian Peak or Snow Lotus Peak, is one of the major mountains of the Tian Shan mountain range. It is notable for its large, steep relief above the nearby valleys, and for its large topographic prominence. (It is ranked 84th in the world by this measure). However, its height is not on List of highest mountains on Earth.

Expeditions
The Tokai Section of the Japanese Alpine Club made four expeditions to Xuelian Feng, in 1986, 1988, 1989, and 1990, with the last being successful in ascending the main summit. (The 1989 expedition ascended the south summit and "Junction Peak", another subpeak to the south of the main summit, with elevation , and came close to but did not reach the main summit.) In 1990, the expedition was led by Kazuo Tukushima, and ascended from the Karakume Glacier. The route ascended the southeast ridge of Junction Peak, then traversed a long (2 km/1.2 mi) corniced snow and rock ridge to reach the main summit tower. Other difficulties involved in the  route included technical rock and ice walls, and snow gullies up to 70 degrees in steepness.

See also
 List of Ultras of Central Asia
 Muzart Pass
 Muzat River

Notes

Mountains of Xinjiang
Six-thousanders of the Tian Shan